The Tibetan Buddhist canon is a loosely defined collection of sacred texts recognized by various schools of Tibetan Buddhism, comprising the Kangyur or Kanjur ('Translation of the Word') and the Tengyur or Tanjur ('Translation of Treatises').

Tibetan Buddhist canon

In addition to earlier foundational Buddhist texts from early Buddhist schools, mostly the Sarvastivada and Mahayana texts, the Tibetan canon includes Tantric texts. The last category is not always sharply distinguished from the others: the Tantra division sometimes includes material usually not thought of as Tantric in other traditions, such as the Heart Sutra and even versions of material found in the Pali Canon.

The Tibetans did not have a formally arranged Mahayana canon, and so devised their own scheme with two broad categories: the "Words of the Buddha" and later the commentaries; the Kangyur and Tengyur respectively. The Tengyur underwent a final compilation in the 14th century by Bu-ston (1290–1364). There is no proof that Bu-ston also took part in the collection and edition of the Tsal pa Kangyur, although he consecrated a copy of this Kangyur 1351 when he visited  (Eimer 1992:178). 

According to sakya mchog ldan (1428-1507), Bu-soon edited a Kanjur; however, it is not known which one. "The Kangyur usually takes up a hundred or a hundred and eight volumes, the Tengyur two hundred and twenty-five, and the two together contain 4,569 works."

Kangyur or "Translated Words" consists of works in about 108 volumes supposed to have been spoken by the Buddha himself. All texts presumably once had a Sanskrit original, although in many cases the Tibetan text was translated from Chinese or some other language.
Tengyur or "Translated Treatises" contains commentaries, treatises and abhidharma works (both Mahayana and non-Mahayana), in all, around 3,626 texts in 224 volumes.

The Kangyur is divided into sections on Vinaya, Perfection of Wisdom sutras, other sutras (75% Mahayana, 25% Hinayana), and tantras. It includes texts on the Vinaya, monastic discipline, metaphysics, and the tantras. Some describe the prajñāpāramitā philosophy, others extol the virtues of the various bodhisattvas, while others expound the Trikāya and the Ālaya-Vijñāna doctrines.

When the term Kangyur was first used is unknown. Collections of canonical Buddhist texts existed already in the time of Trisong Detsen, the sixth king of Tibet, who ruled from 755 until 797 CE, in Spiti.

The exact number of texts in the Kangyur is not fixed. Each editor takes responsibility for removing texts they consider spurious, and adding new translations. Currently there are about 12 available versions of the Kangyur. These include the Derge, Lhasa, Narthang, Cone, Peking, Urga, Phudrak, and Stog Palace versions, each named for the physical location where it was printed. In addition, some canonical texts have been found in Tabo Monastery and Dunhuang which provide earlier exemplars of texts found in the Kangyur. All extant Kangyur appear to stem from the Old Narthang Monastery Kangyur. The stemma of the Kangyur have been well researched, by Helmut Eimer in particular.

Bön Kangyur 

The Tibetan Bön religion also has its canon literature divided into two sections called the Kangyur and Tengyur, said to have been translated from foreign languages, but the number and contents of the collection are not yet fully known. Apparently, Bön began to take on a literary form about the time Buddhism entered Tibet. The Bön Kangyur contains the revelations of Tonpa Shenrab (Wylie: gShen rab), the traditional founder of Bön. A version was published in 1993-1997.

Footnotes

Further reading

External links 
 Resources for Kanjur & Tanjur Studies ~ Universität Wien
 The Tibetan Buddhist Resource Center
 Kangyur @Rigpawiki
 Tibetan Canon
 84000: Translating the Words of the Buddha
 An Account of the Various Editions of Kangyur and the Results of Their Collation
 Csoma, Analysis of the Dulva, part of the Kangyur, Asiatic Researches, Calcutta, 1836, vol. 20-1, pp. 41-93 (en ligne).

Tripiṭaka
Tibetan Buddhist texts